Under the Whyte notation for the classification of steam locomotives by wheel arrangement,  represents the arrangement of six unpowered leading wheels arranged into a three-axle leading truck, eight powered driving wheels, and six unpowered trailing wheels arranged into a three-axle trailing truck.

Other equivalent classifications are:
 UIC classification: 3D3 (also known as German classification and Italian classification)
 French classification: 343
 Turkish classification: 410
 Swiss classification: 4/10.

The only known example of the 6-8-6 wheel arrangement is the experimental Pennsylvania Railroad S2 steam turbine locomotive.

Notes

References 
 

 
8,6-8-6